El Impenetrable National Park is a national park in the Gran Chaco region of northern Argentina. It was established in 2014 on the lands of the former Estancia La Fidelidad, which were expropriated after the owner, Manuel Roseo, was murdered in 2011 in an attempt to gain control of the estate. The park opened to visitors in 2017. It is the largest natural park in northern Argentina, with a total area of approximately  hectares.

References 

National parks of Argentina
Protected areas established in 2017
Gran Chaco